is the debut single by Japanese idol group Shonentai. The single was released on 12 December 1985 under Warner Pioneer label. They performed this song on the 37th Kōhaku Uta Gassen.

Background
The beginning of the phrase, "Tonight ya ya ya, tear" was the idea not by the lyricist but one of the members, Nishikiori. For the arranger, Funayama it was his the most difficult work to be published during his career, due to big pressure from producer, Johnny Kitagawa to produce the best debut song for his idol group.

The single has been released in 3 different editions with each including different B-Side tracks: "Nihon Yoitoko Makafushigi", "One Step Beyond" and "Harukaze ni Iine". The single has been included only in the compilations albums along with two B-side songs.

Commercial performance
The single debuted number 1 in the weekly charts and became the third best-selling single of 1986 there with over 450,000 copies sold.

With this single, they numerous awards in the 28th Japan Record Awards, 37th FNS Music Festival and in the 1986's Japan Music Awards.

Track listing

Type A

Type B

Type C

Cover
In the yearly television show Johnny's Count Down Live, the junior groups performing every year the debut song.

In 2015, another group from the same agency, Arashi covered "Nihon Yoitoko Makafushigi" in their studio album Japonism.

References

1985 singles
Japanese-language songs
1985 songs
Oricon Weekly number-one singles